is one of the official 29 grappling techniques of Kodokan Judo. It is one of the nine joint techniques of the Kansetsu-waza list, one of the three grappling lists in Judo's Katame-waza enumerating 29 grappling techniques. All of Judo's competition legal joint techniques are arm locks.

Technique history

Included systems 
Systems:
Kodokan Judo, Judo Lists
Lists:
The Canon Of Judo
Judo technique
The video, The Essence of Judo featuring Kyuzo Mifune
Jumonji-Gatame-Ude-Kujiki(十文字固腕挫)
Ao-Muke-Gata-Ude-Kujiki(仰向形腕挫)
Sankaku-Gatame-Ude-Kujiki(3rd pattern)(三角固腕挫 その三)

Similar techniques, variants, and aliases 
IJF Official Names:
Ude-hishigi-juji-gatame(腕挫十字固)
U.H. juji-gatame
Juji-gatame(十字固)
JGT

Aliases:
Upper cross arm armlock
Arm Bar
Cross arm breaker

References

External links
Mifune's Goshin Jutsu

Judo technique